Macrophage-stimulating protein (MSP), also known as hepatocyte growth factor-like protein (HLP, HGFL, or HGFLP), is a protein that in humans is encoded by the MST1 (macrophage-stimulating 1) gene.

References

Further reading